Roseville is a census-designated place mainly located in Ulster Township and a small portion in the northern part of Union Township in Floyd County in the state of Iowa. As of the 2010 census the population was 49.

Demographics

References

Census-designated places in Iowa
Populated places in Floyd County, Iowa